Henry X may refer to:
 Henry X, Duke of Bavaria
 Henry X, Count of Reuss-Lobenstein